A software bug is an error, flaw or fault in the design, development, or operation of computer software that causes it to produce an incorrect or unexpected result, or to behave in unintended ways. The process of finding and correcting bugs is termed "debugging" and often uses formal techniques or tools to pinpoint bugs. Since the 1950s, some computer systems have been designed to deter, detect or auto-correct various computer bugs during operations.

Bugs in software can arise from mistakes and errors made in interpreting and extracting users' requirements, planning a program's design, writing its source code, and from interaction with humans, hardware and programs, such as operating systems or libraries. A program with many, or serious, bugs is often described as buggy. Bugs can trigger errors that may have ripple effects. The effects of bugs may be subtle, such as unintended text formatting, through to more obvious effects such as causing a program to crash, freezing the computer, or causing damage to hardware. Other bugs qualify as security bugs and might, for example, enable a malicious user to bypass access controls in order to obtain unauthorized privileges.

Some software bugs have been linked to disasters. Bugs in code that controlled the Therac-25 radiation therapy machine were directly responsible for patient deaths in the 1980s. In 1996, the European Space Agency's US$1 billion prototype Ariane 5 rocket was destroyed less than a minute after launch due to a bug in the on-board guidance computer program. In 1994, an RAF Chinook helicopter crashed, killing 29; this was initially blamed on pilot error, but was later thought to have been caused by a software bug in the engine-control computer. Buggy software caused the early 21st century British Post Office scandal, the most widespread miscarriage of justice in British legal history.

In 2002, a study commissioned by the US Department of Commerce's National Institute of Standards and Technology concluded that "software bugs, or errors, are so prevalent and so detrimental that they cost the US economy an estimated $59 billion annually, or about 0.6 percent of the gross domestic product".

History 

The Middle English word bugge is the basis for the terms "bugbear" and "bugaboo" as terms used for a monster.

The term "bug" to describe defects has been a part of engineering jargon since the 1870s and predates electronics and computers; it may have originally been used in hardware engineering to describe mechanical malfunctions. For instance, Thomas Edison wrote in a letter to an associate in 1878:

Baffle Ball, the first mechanical pinball game, was advertised as being "free of bugs" in 1931. Problems with military gear during World War II were referred to as bugs (or glitches). In a book published in 1942, Louise Dickinson Rich, speaking of a powered ice cutting machine, said, "Ice sawing was suspended until the creator could be brought in to take the bugs out of his darling."

Isaac Asimov used the term "bug" to relate to issues with a robot in his short story "Catch That Rabbit", published in 1944.

The term "bug" was used in an account by computer pioneer Grace Hopper, who publicized the cause of a malfunction in an early electromechanical computer. A typical version of the story is:

Hopper was not present when the bug was found, but it became one of her favorite stories. The date in the log book was September 9, 1947. The operators who found it, including William "Bill" Burke, later of the Naval Weapons Laboratory, Dahlgren, Virginia, were familiar with the engineering term and amusedly kept the insect with the notation "First actual case of bug being found." This log book, complete with attached moth, is part of the collection of the Smithsonian National Museum of American History.

The related term "debug" also appears to predate its usage in computing: the Oxford English Dictionarys etymology of the word contains an attestation from 1945, in the context of aircraft engines.

The concept that software might contain errors dates back to Ada Lovelace's 1843 notes on the analytical engine, in which she speaks of the possibility of program "cards" for Charles Babbage's analytical engine being erroneous:

"Bugs in the System" report 
The Open Technology Institute, run by the group, New America, released a report "Bugs in the System" in August 2016 stating that U.S. policymakers should make reforms to help researchers identify and address software bugs. The report "highlights the need for reform in the field of software vulnerability discovery and disclosure." One of the report's authors said that Congress has not done enough to address cyber software vulnerability, even though Congress has passed a number of bills to combat the larger issue of cyber security.

Government researchers, companies, and cyber security experts are the people who typically discover software flaws. The report calls for reforming computer crime and copyright laws.

Terminology 

While the use of the term "bug" to describe software errors is common, many have suggested that it should be abandoned. One argument is that the word "bug" is divorced from a sense that a human being caused the problem, and instead implies that the defect arose on its own, leading to a push to abandon the term "bug" in favor of terms such as "defect", with limited success. Since the 1970s Gary Kildall somewhat humorously suggested to use the term "blunder".

In software engineering, mistake metamorphism (from Greek meta = "change", morph = "form") refers to the evolution of a defect in the final stage of software deployment. Transformation of a "mistake" committed by an analyst in the early stages of the software development lifecycle, which leads to a "defect" in the final stage of the cycle has been called 'mistake metamorphism'.

Different stages of a "mistake" in the entire cycle may be described as "mistakes", "anomalies", "faults", "failures", "errors", "exceptions", "crashes", "glitches", "bugs", "defects", "incidents", or "side effects".

Prevention 

The software industry has put much effort into reducing bug counts. These include:

Typographical errors 
Bugs usually appear when the programmer makes a logic error. Various innovations in programming style and defensive programming are designed to make these bugs less likely, or easier to spot. Some typos, especially of symbols or logical/mathematical operators, allow the program to operate incorrectly, while others such as a missing symbol or misspelled name may prevent the program from operating. Compiled languages can reveal some typos when the source code is compiled.

Development methodologies 
Several schemes assist managing programmer activity so that fewer bugs are produced. Software engineering (which addresses software design issues as well) applies many techniques to prevent defects. For example, formal program specifications state the exact behavior of programs so that design bugs may be eliminated. Unfortunately, formal specifications are impractical for anything but the shortest programs, because of problems of combinatorial explosion and indeterminacy.

Unit testing involves writing a test for every function (unit) that a program is to perform.

In test-driven development unit tests are written before the code and the code is not considered complete until all tests complete successfully.

Agile software development involves frequent software releases with relatively small changes. Defects are revealed by user feedback.

Open source development allows anyone to examine source code. A school of thought popularized by Eric S. Raymond as Linus's law says that popular open-source software has more chance of having few or no bugs than other software, because "given enough eyeballs, all bugs are shallow". This assertion has been disputed, however: computer security specialist Elias Levy wrote that "it is easy to hide vulnerabilities in complex, little understood and undocumented source code," because, "even if people are reviewing the code, that doesn't mean they're qualified to do so." An example of an open-source software bug was the 2008 OpenSSL vulnerability in Debian.

Programming language support 
Programming languages include features to help prevent bugs, such as static type systems, restricted namespaces and modular programming. For example, when a programmer writes (pseudocode) LET REAL_VALUE PI = "THREE AND A BIT", although this may be syntactically correct, the code fails a type check. Compiled languages catch this without having to run the program. Interpreted languages catch such errors at runtime. Some languages deliberately exclude features that easily lead to bugs, at the expense of slower performance: the general principle being that, it is almost always better to write simpler, slower code than inscrutable code that runs slightly faster, especially considering that maintenance cost is substantial. For example, the Java programming language does not support pointer arithmetic; implementations of some languages such as Pascal and scripting languages often have runtime bounds checking of arrays, at least in a debugging build.

Code analysis 
Tools for code analysis help developers by inspecting the program text beyond the compiler's capabilities to spot potential problems. Although in general the problem of finding all programming errors given a specification is not solvable (see halting problem), these tools exploit the fact that human programmers tend to make certain kinds of simple mistakes often when writing software.

Instrumentation 
Tools to monitor the performance of the software as it is running, either specifically to find problems such as bottlenecks or to give assurance as to correct working, may be embedded in the code explicitly (perhaps as simple as a statement saying PRINT "I AM HERE"), or provided as tools. It is often a surprise to find where most of the time is taken by a piece of code, and this removal of assumptions might cause the code to be rewritten.

Testing 
Software testers are people whose primary task is to find bugs, or write code to support testing.  On some projects, more resources may be spent on testing than in developing the program.

Measurements during testing can provide an estimate of the number of likely bugs remaining; this becomes more reliable the longer a product is tested and developed.

Debugging 

Finding and fixing bugs, or debugging, is a major part of computer programming. Maurice Wilkes, an early computing pioneer, described his realization in the late 1940s that much of the rest of his life would be spent finding mistakes in his own programs.

Usually, the most difficult part of debugging is finding the bug. Once it is found, correcting it is usually relatively easy. Programs known as debuggers help programmers locate bugs by executing code line by line, watching variable values, and other features to observe program behavior. Without a debugger, code may be added so that messages or values may be written to a console or to a window or log file to trace program execution or show values.

However, even with the aid of a debugger, locating bugs is something of an art. It is not uncommon for a bug in one section of a program to cause failures in a completely different section, thus making it especially difficult to track (for example, an error in a graphics rendering routine causing a file I/O routine to fail), in an apparently unrelated part of the system.

Sometimes, a bug is not an isolated flaw, but represents an error of thinking or planning on the part of the programmer. Such logic errors require a section of the program to be overhauled or rewritten. As a part of code review, stepping through the code and imagining or transcribing the execution process may often find errors without ever reproducing the bug as such.

More typically, the first step in locating a bug is to reproduce it reliably. Once the bug is reproducible, the programmer may use a debugger or other tool while reproducing the error to find the point at which the program went astray.

Some bugs are revealed by inputs that may be difficult for the programmer to re-create.  One cause of the Therac-25 radiation machine deaths was a bug (specifically, a race condition) that occurred only when the machine operator very rapidly entered a treatment plan; it took days of practice to become able to do this, so the bug did not manifest in testing or when the manufacturer attempted to duplicate it.  Other bugs may stop occurring whenever the setup is augmented to help find the bug, such as running the program with a debugger; these are called heisenbugs (humorously named after the Heisenberg uncertainty principle).

Since the 1990s, particularly following the Ariane 5 Flight 501 disaster, interest in automated aids to debugging rose, such as static code analysis by abstract interpretation.

Some classes of bugs have nothing to do with the code. Faulty documentation or hardware may lead to problems in system use, even though the code matches the documentation. In some cases, changes to the code eliminate the problem even though the code then no longer matches the documentation. Embedded systems frequently work around hardware bugs, since to make a new version of a ROM is much cheaper than remanufacturing the hardware, especially if they are commodity items.

Benchmark of bugs 

To facilitate reproducible research on testing and debugging, researchers use curated benchmarks of bugs:
 the Siemens benchmark
 ManyBugs is a benchmark of 185 C bugs in nine open-source programs.
 Defects4J is a benchmark of 341 Java bugs from 5 open-source projects. It contains the corresponding patches, which cover a variety of patch type.

Bug management 
Bug management includes the process of documenting, categorizing, assigning, reproducing, correcting and releasing the corrected code. Proposed changes to software – bugs as well as enhancement requests and even entire releases – are commonly tracked and managed using bug tracking systems or issue tracking systems. The items added may be called defects, tickets, issues, or, following the agile development paradigm, stories and epics. Categories may be objective, subjective or a combination, such as version number, area of the software, severity and priority, as well as what type of issue it is, such as a feature request or a bug.

A bug triage reviews bugs and decides whether and when to fix them. The decision is based on the bug's priority, and factors such as project schedules. The triage is not meant to investigate the cause of bugs, but rather the cost of fixing them. The triage happens regularly, and goes through bugs opened or reopened since the previous meeting. The attendees of the triage process typically are the project manager, development manager, test manager, build manager, and technical experts.

Severity 
Severity is the intensity of the impact the bug has on system operation. This impact may be data loss, financial, loss of goodwill and wasted effort. Severity levels are not standardized. Impacts differ across industry. A crash in a video game has a totally different impact than a crash in a web browser, or real time monitoring system. For example, bug severity levels might be "crash or hang", "no workaround" (meaning there is no way the customer can accomplish a given task), "has workaround" (meaning the user can still accomplish the task), "visual defect" (for example, a missing image or displaced button or form element), or "documentation error". Some software publishers use more qualified severities such as "critical", "high", "low", "blocker" or "trivial". The severity of a bug may be a separate category to its priority for fixing, and the two may be quantified and managed separately.

Priority 
Priority controls where a bug falls on the list of planned changes. The priority is decided by each software producer. Priorities may be numerical, such as 1 through 5, or named, such as "critical", "high", "low", or "deferred". These rating scales may be similar or even identical to severity ratings, but are evaluated as a combination of the bug's severity with its estimated effort to fix; a bug with low severity but easy to fix may get a higher priority than a bug with moderate severity that requires excessive effort to fix. Priority ratings may be aligned with product releases, such as "critical" priority indicating all the bugs that must be fixed before the next software release.

A bug severe enough to delay or halt the release of the product is called a "show stopper" or "showstopper bug". It is named so because it "stops the show" – causes unacceptable product failure.

Software releases 
It is common practice to release software with known, low-priority bugs. Bugs of sufficiently high priority may warrant a special release of part of the code containing only modules with those fixes. These are known as patches. Most releases include a mixture of behavior changes and multiple bug fixes. Releases that emphasize bug fixes are known as maintenance releases, to differentiate it from major releases that emphasize feature additions or changes.

Reasons that a software publisher opts not to patch or even fix a particular bug include:
 A deadline must be met and resources are insufficient to fix all bugs by the deadline.
 The bug is already fixed in an upcoming release, and it is not of high priority.
 The changes required to fix the bug are too costly or affect too many other components, requiring a major testing activity.
 It may be suspected, or known, that some users are relying on the existing buggy behavior; a proposed fix may introduce a breaking change.
 The problem is in an area that will be obsolete with an upcoming release; fixing it is unnecessary.
 "It's not a bug, it's a feature". A misunderstanding has arisen between expected and perceived behavior or undocumented feature.

Types 

In software development projects, a mistake or error may be introduced at any stage. Bugs arise from oversight or misunderstanding by a software team during specification, design, coding, configuration, data entry or documentation. For example, a relatively simple program to alphabetize a list of words, the design might fail to consider what should happen when a word contains a hyphen. Or when converting an abstract design into code, the coder might inadvertently create an off-by-one error which can be a "<" where "<=" was intended, and fail to sort the last word in a list.

Another category of bug is called a race condition that may occur when programs have multiple components executing at the same time. If the components interact in a different order than the developer intended, they could interfere with each other and stop the program from completing its tasks. These bugs may be difficult to detect or anticipate, since they may not occur during every execution of a program.

Conceptual errors are a developer's misunderstanding of what the software must do. The resulting software may perform according to the developer's understanding, but not what is really needed. Other types:

Arithmetic 
In operations on numerical values, problems can arise that result in unexpected output, slowing of a process, or crashing. These can be from a lack of awareness of the qualities of the data storage such as a loss of precision due to rounding, numerically unstable algorithms, arithmetic overflow and underflow, or from lack of awareness of how calculations are handled by different software coding languages such as division by zero which in some languages may throw an exception, and in others may return a special value such as NaN or infinity.

Control flow 

Control flow bugs are those found in processes with valid logic, but that lead to unintended results, such as infinite loops and infinite recursion, incorrect comparisons for conditional statements such as using the incorrect comparison operator, and off-by-one errors (counting one too many or one too few iterations when looping).

Interfacing 
 Incorrect API usage.
 Incorrect protocol implementation.
 Incorrect hardware handling.
 Incorrect assumptions of a particular platform.
 Incompatible systems. A new API or communications protocol may seem to work when two systems use different versions, but errors may occur when a function or feature implemented in one version is changed or missing in another. In production systems which must run continually, shutting down the entire system for a major update may not be possible, such as in the telecommunication industry or the internet. In this case, smaller segments of a large system are upgraded individually, to minimize disruption to a large network. However, some sections could be overlooked and not upgraded, and cause compatibility errors which may be difficult to find and repair.
 Incorrect code annotations.

Concurrency 
 Deadlock, where task A cannot continue until task B finishes, but at the same time, task B cannot continue until task A finishes.
 Race condition, where the computer does not perform tasks in the order the programmer intended.
 Concurrency errors in critical sections, mutual exclusions and other features of concurrent processing. Time-of-check-to-time-of-use (TOCTOU) is a form of unprotected critical section.

Resourcing 

 Null pointer dereference.
 Using an uninitialized variable.
 Using an otherwise valid instruction on the wrong data type (see packed decimal/binary-coded decimal).
 Access violations.
 Resource leaks, where a finite system resource (such as memory or file handles) become exhausted by repeated allocation without release.
 Buffer overflow, in which a program tries to store data past the end of allocated storage. This may or may not lead to an access violation or storage violation. These are frequently security bugs.
 Excessive recursion which—though logically valid—causes stack overflow.
 Use-after-free error, where a pointer is used after the system has freed the memory it references.
 Double free error.

Syntax 

 Use of the wrong token, such as performing assignment instead of equality test. For example, in some languages x=5 will set the value of x to 5 while x==5 will check whether x is currently 5 or some other number. Interpreted languages allow such code to fail. Compiled languages can catch such errors before testing begins.

Teamwork 
 Unpropagated updates; e.g. programmer changes "myAdd" but forgets to change "mySubtract", which uses the same algorithm. These errors are mitigated by the Don't Repeat Yourself philosophy.
 Comments out of date or incorrect: many programmers assume the comments accurately describe the code.
 Differences between documentation and product.

Implications 
The amount and type of damage a software bug may cause naturally affects decision-making, processes and policy regarding software quality. In applications such as human spaceflight, aviation, nuclear power, health care, public transport or automotive safety, since software flaws have the potential to cause human injury or even death, such software will have far more scrutiny and quality control than, for example, an online shopping website. In applications such as banking, where software flaws have the potential to cause serious financial damage to a bank or its customers, quality control is also more important than, say, a photo editing application.

Other than the damage caused by bugs, some of their cost is due to the effort invested in fixing them. In 1978, Lientz et al. showed that the median of projects invest 17 percent of the development effort in bug fixing. In 2020, research on GitHub repositories showed the median is 20%.

Residual bugs in delivered product 
In 1994, NASA's Goddard Space Flight Center managed to reduce their average number of errors from 4.5 per 1000 lines of code (SLOC) down to 1 per 1000 SLOC.

Another study in 1990 reported that exceptionally good software development processes can achieve deployment failure rates as low as 0.1 per 1000 SLOC. This figure is iterated in literature such as Code Complete by Steve McConnell, and the NASA study on Flight Software Complexity. Some projects even attained zero defects: the firmware in the IBM Wheelwriter typewriter which consists of 63,000 SLOC, and the Space Shuttle software with 500,000 SLOC.

Well-known bugs 

A number of software bugs have become well-known, usually due to their severity: examples include various space and military aircraft crashes. Possibly the most famous bug is the Year 2000 problem or Y2K bug, which caused many programs written long before the transition from 19xx to 20xx dates to malfunction, for example treating a date such as "25 Dec 04" as being in 1904, displaying "19100" instead of "2000", and so on. A huge effort at the end of the 20th century resolved the most severe problems, and there were no major consequences.

The 2012 stock trading disruption involved one such incompatibility between the old API and a new API.

In popular culture 
 In both the 1968 novel 2001: A Space Odyssey and the corresponding 1968 film 2001: A Space Odyssey, a spaceship's onboard computer, HAL 9000, attempts to kill all its crew members. In the follow-up 1982 novel, 2010: Odyssey Two, and the accompanying 1984 film, 2010, it is revealed that this action was caused by the computer having been programmed with two conflicting objectives: to fully disclose all its information, and to keep the true purpose of the flight secret from the crew; this conflict caused HAL to become paranoid and eventually homicidal.
 In the English version of the Nena 1983 song 99 Luftballons (99 Red Balloons) as a result of "bugs in the software", a release of a group of 99 red balloons are mistaken for an enemy nuclear missile launch, requiring an equivalent launch response, resulting in catastrophe. 
 In the 1999 American comedy Office Space, three employees attempt (unsuccessfully) to exploit their company's preoccupation with the Y2K computer bug using a computer virus that sends rounded-off fractions of a penny to their bank account—a long-known technique described as salami slicing.
 The 2004 novel The Bug, by Ellen Ullman, is about a programmer's attempt to find an elusive bug in a database application.
 The 2008 Canadian film Control Alt Delete is about a computer programmer at the end of 1999 struggling to fix bugs at his company related to the year 2000 problem.

See also 

 Anti-pattern
 Bug bounty program
 Glitch removal
 Hardware bug
 ISO/IEC 9126, which classifies a bug as either a defect or a nonconformity
 Orthogonal Defect Classification
 Racetrack problem
 RISKS Digest
 Software defect indicator
 Software regression
 Software rot
 Automatic bug fixing

References

External links 

 "Common Weakness Enumeration" – an expert webpage focus on bugs, at NIST.gov
 BUG type of Jim Gray – another Bug type
 
 "The First Computer Bug!" – an email from 1981 about Adm. Hopper's bug
 "Toward Understanding Compiler Bugs in GCC and LLVM". A 2016 study of bugs in compilers